Trevor Clark may refer to:

 Trevor Clark (cricketer) (1908–1992), New Zealand cricketer
 Trevor Clark (weightlifter) (1916–1984), New Zealand weightlifter
 Trevor Clark (rugby league)